Galeocorax is an extinct genus of mackerel sharks that lived during the Late Cretaceous. It contains a single valid species, G. jaekeli, that has been found in Europe and North America.

References

Cretaceous sharks
Cretaceous fish of Europe
Cretaceous fish of North America
Lamniformes
Prehistoric shark genera